James Douglas Waltermire (February 15, 1949 – April 8, 1988) was an American politician.

Born in Choteau, Teton County, Montana, Waltermire served on the Missoula County, Montana Board of Commissioners in 1977. In 1978, he lost the election to the United States House of Representatives on the Republican Party ticket. From 1981 until his death in 1988, Waltermire served as Montana Secretary of State. Waltermire died in an airplane crash near the Helena Regional Airport in Helena, Montana. Waltermire was seeking the Republican nomination for the office of the Governor of Montana at the time of his death.

Notes

External links

1949 births
1988 deaths
People from Choteau, Montana
Montana Republicans
County commissioners in Montana
Secretaries of State of Montana
Accidental deaths in Montana
Victims of aviation accidents or incidents in the United States
20th-century American politicians